Putro is a 2018 Bangladeshi film. Saiful Islam Mannu directed the film under the supervision of Impress Telefilm Limited. The film won 11 awards, including the awards for Best Film and Best Actor at the 43rd Bangladesh National Film Awards.

Plot
The film explores the social stigma surrounding autism.

Cast
 Ferdous Ahmed
 Jaya Ahsan
 Azizul Hakim
 Dilara Zaman
 Shams Sumon
 Guest Appearance
 Samina Chowdhury
 Mehreen
 Bappa Mazumder

Music
The music of the film was composed by Zulfiqer Russell. The singers were Sabina Yasmin, Samina Chowdhury, Bappa Mazumder, Mehreen, Naimul Islam Ratul.

Awards

References

External links

Bengali-language Bangladeshi films
2018 films
2010s Bengali-language films
Best Film National Film Award (Bangladesh) winners
Films whose writer won the Best Screenplay National Film Award (Bangladesh)